The Ryan Cup is the tier 2 hurling championship for third level colleges, the Fitzgibbon Cup being the tier 1 hurling championship trophy. The Ryan Cup competition is administered by Comhairle Ard Oideachais Cumann Lúthchleas Gael (CLG), the GAA's Higher Education Council.

At some time either in the late 1980s or in the early 1990s, the Ryan Cup - the trophy for the Division 1 Gaelic football league - was presented to the winners of what was then the Division II Championship (non-university). As a result of this mix-up, the Division II Championship became colloquially known as the 'Ryan Cup'. Unfortunately several other GAA trophy competitions bear this name, including still the Higher Education First-Division football league.

The GAA Higher Education Cup Championships are sponsored by Electric Ireland. The Ryan Cup was previously sponsored by Independent.ie [2014-2017], Irish Daily Mail [2012-2013], Ulster Bank [2007-2011], Datapac [2003-2006] and Bus Éireann [1998-2002].

Ryan Cup Tournament 2018-19

2018-19 Group A Qualifying

Qualifiers: Galway-Mayo IT; Ulster University

2018-19 Group B Qualifying

Qualifiers: Institute of Technology Tralee; Athlone IT

2018-19 Finals Tournament

Roll of honour

Colleges by wins

Ryan Cup Champion Colleges
Compiled from The Cups That Cheered. The current names of academic institutions are shown in parentheses.

 1976/77 Cork RTC [Cork IT]
 1977/78 St Patrick's TC, Drumcondra
 1978/79 RTC Carlow [IT Carlow]
 1979/80 Cork RTC [Cork IT]
 1980/81 Mary Immaculate College, Limerick
 1981/82 Mary Immaculate College, Limerick
 1982/83 Limerick RTC [Limerick IT]
 1983/84 Thomond College [University of Limerick]
 1984/85 Limerick RTC (Limerick IT)
 1985/86 Thomond College [University of Limerick]
 1986/87 Waterford RTC [Waterford IT]
 1987/88 Limerick RTC [Limerick IT]
 1988/89 Cork RTC [Cork IT]
 1989/90 Galway RTC [Galway-Mayo IT]
 1990/91 RTC Carlow [IT Carlow]
 1991/92 Limerick RTC [Limerick IT]
 1992/93 RTC Carlow [IT Carlow]
 1993/94 Dublin IT
 1994/95 Garda Síochána College
 1995/96 Athlone RTC [Athlone IT]
 1996/97 RTC Tralee
 1997/98 Dublin City University
 1998/99 IT Sligo
 1999/00 Cork Colleges of Further Education
 2000/01 Limerick IT
 2001/02 Dublin City University
 2002/03 Tipperary Institute [Limerick IT Tipperary]
 2003/04 Cork Colleges of Further Education
 2004/05 IT Sligo
 2005/06 Mary Immaculate College, Limerick
 2006/07 RTC Tralee
 2007/08 Maynooth University
 2008/09 Mary Immaculate College, Limerick
 2009/10 IT Carlow
 2010/11 RTC Tralee
 2011/12 Mary Immaculate College, Limerick
 2012/13 Limerick IT Tipperary
 2013/14 NUI Maynooth [Maynooth University]
 2014/15 Trinity College Dublin
 2015/16 Trinity College Dublin
 2016/17 Garda Síochána College
 2017/18 Maynooth University
 2018/19 Galway-Mayo IT
 2019/20
 2020/21
 2021/22 MTU Kerry Campus 
 2022/23 MIC St Patrick’s Campus Thurles

Captains of winning teams

Man of The Match awardees

Finals listed by year
Under Match Details below, academic institutions are referred to by their names at the time of the competition. References give the current names of the institutions.

References

1976 establishments in Ireland
Hurling competitions at Irish universities
Hurling cup competitions